Alice Lévêque (born 9 May 1989) is a French handball player. She plays for the club ESBF Besançon and on the French national team. She represented France at the 2013 World Women's Handball Championship in Serbia.

References

French female handball players
1989 births
Living people
Sportspeople from Mulhouse
Mediterranean Games medalists in handball
Mediterranean Games gold medalists for France
Competitors at the 2009 Mediterranean Games